The list of University of Central Oklahoma alumni includes notable alumni, non-matriculating students, and former faculty of the University of Central Oklahoma.

Notable alumni

Arts and entertainment
 Scott Booker, manager for The Flaming Lips; Executive Director of ACM@UCO
 Jeremy Castle, singer songwriter
 T. C. Cannon (Kiowa/Caddo, 1946–1978), painter and printmaker
 Stan Case, CNN Radio and Headline News anchor
 Dave Garrett, former New Orleans Saints and Dallas Cowboys radio broadcaster
 Bill Glass Jr. (Cherokee Nation), ceramic artist and sculptor
 Milena Govich, actress, TV series Law & Order
 All four members of the multi-platinum rock group Hinder
 Lauren Nelson, Miss America 2007
 Betty Lou Shipley, Poet Laureate of Oklahoma, 1997–98
 W. K. Stratton, author
 Emoly West, Miss Oklahoma 2010
 Jamie McGuire, author

Athletics
 Joe Aska, former NFL player
 Hap Barnard, former NFL player (1938–1938)
 Bob Briggs, former NFL player (1965–1965)
 Clifford Chatman, former NFL player (1982–1982)
 Ken Corley, former BBA/NBA basketball player
 Jermelle Cudjo, football player, St. Louis Rams
 Tim Elliott, mixed martial artist, currently with the Ultimate Fighting Championship, wrestled at Central Oklahoma
 A. J. Haglund, former NFL player
 Jared Hess, All-American wrestler, retired professional MMA fighter
 Muhammed Lawal, NCAA Division II National Champion (2002), current MMA fighter, formerly for Strikeforce and now Bellator Fighting Championship
 J. W. Lockett, former NFL player (1961–1964) and CFL player (1965–1966)
 Eddie Robinson, former NBA player
 John Sterling, former NFL player
 Hurley Tarver, former NFL player
 Keith Traylor, former NFL player
 Derek Ware, former NFL player (1992–1996)
 Paul Wight, pro wrestler
 Robin Freeman, PGA Tour and Champions Tour golfer

Business
 Bijan Allipour, Iranian business executive; CEO of NISOC
 Chad Richison, founder, president and CEO Chief Executive Officer of Paycom
 Randall L. Stephenson, (CEO) Chief Executive Officer and Chairman of AT&T

Science and technology
 Dr. Dwight E. Adams, former Director of the FBI Laboratory; member of the FBI’s research team that developed the DNA techniques first used in 1988; recipient of 2003 Presidential Rank Award as Distinguished Executive, the highest award given in the Federal Government; Director of the University of Central Oklahoma Forensic Science Institute
 Milt Heflin, first Chief Flight Director; former General Director, NASA, Johnson Space Center

Politics and government

 Michael D. Brown, former FEMA director
 Donna Campbell, member of the Texas Senate; emergency room physician in New Braunfels, Texas; received bachelor's degree in nursing, c. 1976
Mary Fallin, former Governor of Oklahoma
 Danny Morgan, Oklahoma State Representative and leader of the Oklahoma House Democratic Caucus
 Kevin Ward, Oklahoma Secretary of Safety and Security and Oklahoma Commissioner of Public Safety

Notable faculty
 James Bidlack, Professor of Biology, President of Metabolism Foundation; Vice President and Chief Science Officer of Genome Registry

References

University of Central Oklahoma people
 
People